The Strike Attack Operational Evaluation Unit (SAOEU) or Strike Attack OEU, was a unit of the Royal Air Force based at RAF Boscombe Down in Wiltshire between 1988 and 2004. The unit operated the Panavia Tornado GR1 and GR4, BAE Harrier and SEPECAT Jaguar aircraft. The role of the SAOEU was to evaluate new and existing equipment and to develop fast-jet ground attack tactics in order to provide timely advice to the front line.

History

Tornado Operational Evaluation Unit 
The Strike Attack Operational Evaluation Unit (SAOEU) has its origins in the RAF's Tornado Operational Evaluation Unit (TOEU) which was formed on 1 September 1983 after the earlier introduction of the Panavia Tornado GR1 to the RAF during 1981. Boscombe Down in Wiltshire was chosen as the home of the TOEU, to benefit from working alongside the Aeroplane and Armament Experimental Establishment (A&AEE) which already carried out various aircraft and weapons trials. Equipped with two Tornado GR1s, the TOEU's role was to test and evaluate the Tornado's weapons aiming systems, terrain following radar and conduct other trials as required. Although only anticipated to be in existence for two years, it became clear there was further requirements for development and trials work which justified the retention of the unit.

Establishment 
The Tornados were joined by the BAE Harrier GR7 in 1988 and to reflect the wider range of aircraft operated, the unit was officially retitled as the Strike Attack Operational Evaluation Unit (SAOEU). The majority of work involving the Harrier focussed on developing tactics and operating procedures for the new Harrier GR7. 

During the mid 1990s the RAF upgraded the SEPECAT Jaguar fleet and therefore in 1996 the Jaguar was added to the SAOEU's fleet.

By 2001, the unit operated three Tornados, three Harriers and one Jaguar.

Merger 
On 1 April 2004, after sixteen years of operations, the SAOEU was merged with the Tornado F3 OEU (based at RAF Coningsby in Lincolnshire) and the Air Guided Weapons OEU (based at RAF Valley in Anglesey), to form the Fast Jet Weapons Operational Evaluation Unit (FJWOEU) which established its home at RAF Coningsby. The FJWOEU later merged with the Fast Jet Test Squadron on 1 April 2006 and took on the No. 41 Squadron numberplate, to become No. 41 (Test and Evaluation) Squadron.

Operations 

The role of the SAOEU was to evaluate new and existing equipment and to develop fast-jet ground attack tactics in order to provide timely advice to the front line.

All aircrew were either Qualified Weapons Instructors (QWIs) or Electronic Warfare Instructors (EWIs) and each had accumulated over 1500 flying hours on their respective aircraft. Around 65 engineering personnel maintained the SAOEU fleet.

SAOEU work was tasked by the Air Warfare Centre, Headquarters of No. 1 Group or Headquarters of RAF Strike Command.

Special Projects Team 
The Special Projects Team (SPT) flight was led by a Flight Lieutenant and was tasked with fitting experimental modifications for trial or urgent requirements to all three of the SAOEU's aircraft types. The team was responsible for drafting the engineering procedures to allow others to implement the modifications once they have been approved.

Deployments 
The unit deployed to the United States on an annual basis for a series of trials codenamed Exercise Highrider. Based at Naval Air Weapons Station (NAWS) China Lake in California, the unit took advantage of the favourable climate and extensive range facilities at China Lake and the Nellis Test and Training Range in Nevada. Highrider exercises allowed the unit to drop live weaponry on a more reliable basis than in the UK, where the only range where live weapons can be used is at Cape Wrath in the Scottish Highlands.

The SAOEU also regularly took part in Combined Qualified Weapons Instructor (CQW) course and NITEX exercises at RAF Leuchars in Fife, where the operated alongside other RAF and NATO units.

See also 

 List of Royal Air Force units & establishments

References

Sources 
 

Royal Air Force units
Military units and formations established in 1988
1988 establishments in the United Kingdom
2004 disestablishments in the United Kingdom
Military units and formations disestablished in 2004